Nullarbor is a locality in the Australian state of South Australia located  to the west of the town of Ceduna in the western part of the state immediately adjoining the border with Western Australia.

Geography
The name and extent of the locality was officially established on 26 April 2013 in respect to "the long established local name."  Its name is derived from the use of "Nullarbor" in geographic features such as the Nullarbor Plain and protected areas such as the Nullarbor Regional Reserve. Nullarbor is bounded in the west by the Western Australia - South Australian state border, in the south by the coastline adjoining the Great Australian Bight, to the east by the localities of Yalata and Yellabinna and to the north by the Trans-Australian Railway.

Nullarbor contains two heritage-listed sites - the Koonalda Cave and the Koonalda Homestead Complex which are both listed on the South Australian Heritage Register while the former is also listed on the Australian National Heritage List.

Land use
The land use within Nullarbor is concerned with the following protected areas which fully cover its extent - the Nullarbor Regional Reserve to the north of the locality, the Nullarbor National Park which occupies a strip running from the border and the Nullarbor Wilderness Protection Area which adjoins the coastline with the Great Australian Bight.  Uses included tourism and research associated with the locality's natural features, mineral exploration in the Regional Reserve, and use by indigenous communities for purposes such as cultural activities.

Access
The Eyre Highway is the major road passing through the locality to Western Australia.  Settlements located along the Highway include one known as  "Nullarbor" at the eastern boundary of the locality and Border Village at the western boundary of the locality at the Western Australian border.  These provide services for tourists and travellers such as accommodation and vehicle fuel.

Politics
Nullarbor is located within the federal Division of Grey, the state electoral districts of Flinders and Giles, and the Pastoral Unincorporated Area of South Australia where municipal services are provided to communities such as Border Village by a South Australian government agency, the Outback Communities Authority.

Climate
Nullarbor is located in an area with a mild semi-arid climate described as Köppen climate classification BSk..

See also
 List of cities and towns in South Australia
Bunda Cliffs
Murrawijinie Cave
 Nullarbor Links
Wilson Bluff, Western and South Australian border
Cook, South Australia
Bunburra Rockhole (meteorite)
 List of extreme temperatures in Australia

References

Notes

Citations

Towns in South Australia
Nullarbor Plain
Places in the unincorporated areas of South Australia
Eyre Highway